Saint-Paër is a commune in the Seine-Maritime department in the Normandy region in northern France.

Geography

Population

Places of interest
 The church of St. Paër, dating from the eleventh century.
 The chapel of the Trinity at Mesnil-Varin, dating from the seventeenth century.
 The seventeenth-century chateau of Aulnay.
 The chateau des Vieux, also named château of Bois-Guéroult, built in the XVIIth, where lived the lords des Vieux or Bois-Guéroult.
 The chapel of the château of Bois-Guéroult.

People
 Henri Gadeau de Kerville, zoologist, set up his laboratory here in 1910.

See also
Communes of the Seine-Maritime department

References

Communes of Seine-Maritime
Seine-Maritime communes articles needing translation from French Wikipedia